Marián Šmatlák (born 23 May 2003) is a Slovak professional footballer who last played for Riteriai as an attacking midfielder.

Club career

ViOn Zlaté Moravce
Šmatlák made his Fortuna Liga debut for ViOn Zlaté Moravce against Spartak Trnava on 19 September 2020. In May 2021, ViOn had released Šmatlák from a three-year contract due to apparent pressures from his agent to influence the manager Ľuboš Benkovský to improve Šmatlák's role in the team.

Pohronie
On 24 June 2021, Pohronie have announced the signing of Šmatlák, who arrived as a free transfer.

Riteriai
On 1 February 2023 announced that FK Riteriai signed with Marián Šmatlák. On 3 March 2023 he made debut in A Lyga agianst FA Šiauliai.

References

External links
 FC ViOn Zlaté Moravce official club profile 
 
 Futbalnet profile 
 

2003 births
Living people
Sportspeople from Nitra
Slovak footballers
Slovak expatriate footballers
Slovakia youth international footballers
Association football midfielders
FC ViOn Zlaté Moravce players
FK Pohronie players
FK Riteriai players
Slovak Super Liga players
A Lyga players
Expatriate footballers in Lithuania
Slovak expatriate sportspeople in Lithuania